Prince Heng of the First Rank, or simply Prince Heng, was the title of a princely peerage used in China during the Manchu-led Qing dynasty (1636–1912). As the Prince Heng peerage was not awarded "iron-cap" status, this meant that each successive bearer of the title would normally start off with a title downgraded by one rank vis-à-vis that held by his predecessor. However, the title would generally not be downgraded to any lower than a feng'en fuguo gong except under special circumstances.

The first bearer of the title was Yunqi (允祺; 1680–1732), the Kangxi Emperor's fifth son. He was granted the title "Prince Heng of the First Rank" by his father in 1709. The title was passed down over nine generations and held by 12 persons.

Members of the Prince Heng peerage
 Yunqi (允祺; 1680–1732), the Kangxi Emperor's fifth son, initially a beile from 1698 to 1709, promoted to Prince Heng of the First Rank in 1709, posthumously honoured as Prince Hengwen of the First Rank (恆溫親王)
 Hongzhi (弘晊; 1700–1775), Yunqi's second son, initially a feng'en fuguo gong, promoted to feng'en zhenguo gong in 1727 and then to Prince Heng of the First Rank in 1732, posthumously honoured as Prince Hengke of the First Rank (恆恪親王)
 Yonghao (永皓; 1755–1788), Hongzhi's tenth son, held the title Prince Heng of the Second Rank from 1775 to 1788, posthumously honoured as Prince Hengjing of the Second Rank (恆敬郡王)
 Hongsheng (弘昇; 1696–1754), Yunqi's eldest son, held the title Prince Heng of the First Rank from 1720 to 1727, stripped of his title in 1727, posthumously honoured as a beile under the title Gongke Beile (恭恪貝勒) in 1754
 Yongze (永澤; 1741–1810), Hongsheng's third son, held the title of a buru bafen fuguo gong from 1775 to 1790, promoted to beizi in 1790
 Mianjiang (綿疆; 1777–1811), Yongze's third son, held the title of a third class zhenguo jiangjun from 1799 to 1810, promoted to feng'en zhenguo gong in 1810
 Yikui (奕奎; 1803–1841), Miansong's second son and Mianjiang's adoptive son, held the title of a feng'en zhenguo gong from 1811 to 1835, stripped of his title in 1835
 Miansong (綿崧; 1780–1837), Yongze's fourth son, held the title of a first class fuguo jiangjun from 1799 to 1835, promoted to feng'en fuguo gong in 1835
 Yongxun (永勳; 1738–1786), Hongzhi's third son, held the title of a second class fengguo jiangjun from 1765 to 1781
 Mianguo (綿果), Yongxun's fourth son, held the title of a feng'en jiangjun from 1781 to 1816
 Yizheng (奕徵), Mianguo's eldest son, held the title of a feng'en jiangjun from 1819 to 1849, had no male heir
 Mianhuai (綿懷; 1770–1814), Yongxun's son and Yonghao's adoptive son
 Yili (奕禮; 1792–1849), Mianhuai's eldest son, held the title of a feng'en fuguo gong from 1839 to 1849
 Zaifu (載茯; 1809–1862), Yili's eldest son, held the title of a second class fuguo jiangjun from 1839 to 1850, promoted to feng'en fuguo gong in 1849
 Puquan (溥泉; 1836–1864), Zaifu's eldest son, held the title of a buru bafen fuguo gong from 1863 to 1864
 Yusen (毓森; 1860–?), Puquan's eldest son, held the title of a buru bafen fuguo gong from 1865
 Henggui (恆溎; 1911–?), Yusen's second son, held the title of a buru bafen fuguo gong
 Zaimao (載茂), Yili's third son, held the title of a first class fengguo jiangjun from 1844 to 1858
 Pujing (溥鏡), Zaimao's eldest son, held the title of a feng'en jiangjun from 1858 to 1866, stripped of his title in 1866
 Hong'ang (弘昂; 1705–1782), Yunqi's fourth son, held the title of a first class zhenguo jiangjun from 1725 to 1775, stripped of his title in 1775
 Hongxu (弘昫; 1710–1753), Yunqi's sixth son, held the title of a feng'en jiangjun from 1735 to 1740
 Yongqing (永慶), Hongxu's second son, held the title of a feng'en jiangjun from 1740 to 1777
 Mianzhang (綿彰), Yongqing's eldest son, held the title of a feng'en jiangjun from 1777 to 1810
 Hongtong (弘曈; 1711–1754), Yunqi's seventh son, held the title of a feng'en jiangjun from 1735 to 1741
 Yongnai (永鼐), Hongtong's second son, held the title of a feng'en jiangjun in 1741
 Yongchun (永春), Hongtong's eldest son, held the title of a feng'en jiangjun from 1741 to 1758
 Miangang (綿綱), Yongchun's eldest son, held the title of a feng'en jiangjun from 1759 to 1760, stripped of his title in 1760
 Yongxin (永馨), Hongzhi's eldest son, held the title of a second class fuguo jiangjun from 1756 to 1760
 Mianquan (綿銓), Yongxin's eldest son, held the title of a third class fengguo jiangjun from 1761 to 1775, stripped of his title in 1775

Family tree

See also
 Royal and noble ranks of the Qing dynasty

References
 

Qing dynasty princely peerages
Peerages of the Bordered White Banner